Thomas William Steel Watkin (21 September 1932 – 2001) was an English footballer who played as an inside forward.

Watkin was an England schoolboy international who came through the junior ranks at Grimsby Town, signing a professional contract with them in October 1949. In December 1952, Watkin joined Gateshead, scoring a total of 14 goals in 40 league and cup appearances before moving to neighbours Middlesbrough in March 1954, where he scored 2 goals in 11 games. Watkin joined Mansfield Town in June 1955, scoring 5 goals in 26 league and cup games.

Sources

1932 births
2001 deaths
English footballers
Association football forwards
Grimsby Town F.C. players
Gateshead F.C. players
Middlesbrough F.C. players
Mansfield Town F.C. players
English Football League players